The Fellowship of Christian Councils and Churches in West Africa (FECCIWA) is a Christian ecumenical organization founded in 1994. It is a member of the World Council of Churches. It includes member churches in Ghana, Guinea, Nigeria, Togo, Sierra Leone, Benin, Liberia, Burkina Faso, Senegal, and Niger.

External links  
 
World Council of Churches listing

Christian organizations established in 1994
Members of the World Council of Churches
Christian organizations based in Africa
Regional councils of churches